The Roman Catholic Diocese of Quelimane is a diocese located in the city of Quelimane in the Ecclesiastical province of Beira in Mozambique.

History
The Diocese of Quelimane was established on 6 October 1954, with territory taken from the Diocese of Beira.

Cathedral
The Cathedral is the Catedral Nova in Quelimane. The former cathedral is Catedral velha de Nossa Senhora do Livramento in Quelimane.

Bishops of Quelimane
 Francisco Nunes Teixeira (6 February 1955 – 23 December 1975)
 Bernardo Filipe Governo, OFM

Cap (31 May 1976 – 10 March 2007)
 Hilário da Cruz Massinga, OFM (25 January 2008 – )

See also
Catholic Church in Mozambique
List of Catholic dioceses in Mozambique

Sources
 GCatholic.org
 Catholic Hierarchy

Quelimane
Christian organizations established in 1954
Roman Catholic dioceses and prelatures established in the 20th century
1954 establishments in Mozambique
Roman Catholic Ecclesiastical Province of Beira